Embry is a commune in the Pas-de-Calais department in the Hauts-de-France region of France.

Geography
A village situated some 10 miles (16 km) east of Montreuil-sur-Mer at the D149 and D108 crossroads.

Population

Some houses in the village are second homes, owned by British or Dutch families attracted by inexpensive property.  The result has been to bring money into the area and old houses have been preserved by renovation.

Places of interest
 Vestiges of an ancient château.
 The Maison Sainte Marguerite, dated 1630.
 The fifteenth century church of Saint Martin
Since 2007 a local society for the preservation of the Church (APSE) has been active in fund raising and in generally overseeing the Church's part in the village heritage.

See also
Communes of the Pas-de-Calais department

References

External links

 Statistical data, INSEE
 Website of an inhabitant of Embry 

Communes of Pas-de-Calais